Sanook may refer to:

Sanook or sanuk, a Thai word meaning "fun"; see the entry for สนุก at Wiktionary
Sanook.com, a Thai website
Sanuk, Iran, also spelled Sanook, a village in Iran